The Copa del Rey de Rugby (previously known as Campeonato de España de Rugby) is the national rugby cup. The competition was founded in 1926 and, currently is the second most important competition after the División de Honor de Rugby.

All champions

Palmarés

Wins by team

See also
 División de Honor de Rugby
 Supercopa de España de Rugby
 Rugby union in Spain

References

External links
2015–16 edition schedule and results

 
Rugby union competitions in Spain
1926 establishments in Spain